Natalia Carvajal Sánchez (born September 14, 1990) is a Costa Rican model and beauty pageant titleholder who won the Miss Universe Costa Rica 2018 on April 27, 2018 in Costa Rica.

Personal life
Carvajal is a TV host, a publicist, a literature student and ex contestant of the Costa Rican version of Dancing with the Stars.

Pageantry

Miss Eco International 2016
Carvajal was crowned as Miss Eco International 2016.

Miss Costa Rica 2018
Carvajal was crowned as Miss Costa Rica 2018 and she succeeded outgoing Miss Costa Rica 2017 Elena Correa.

Miss Universe 2018
Carvajal represented Costa Rica at Miss Universe 2018 pageant in Bangkok, Thailand.  She placed in Top 10.

References

External links
teletica.com
missuniverse.com

Living people
1991 births
Miss Universe 2018 contestants
People from Escazú (canton)
Costa Rican beauty pageant winners
Costa Rican female models